Glatigny may refer to the following places in France:

Glatigny, Loir-et-Cher, a former parish of Souday, Loir-et-Cher department
Glatigny, Manche, in the Manche department 
Glatigny, Moselle, in the Moselle department
Glatigny, Oise, in the Oise department 
Clagny-Glatigny, a quarter of Versailles, in the Yvelines department

Glatigny is also the name of several castles and manors in France:

 château de Glatigny, in Souday, in the Loir-et-Cher department
 manoir de Glatigny, in Savigny-sur-Braye, in the Loir-et-Cher department
 manoir de Glatigny, in Tourgéville, in the Calvados department
 château de Glatigny, in Glatigny in the Manche department
 château de Glatigny, in Cuissai, in the Orne department